Knowsley can refer to:

England
Knowsley, Merseyside, village
Metropolitan Borough of Knowsley, local government district
Knowsley Safari Park
Knowsley (UK Parliament constituency), current parliamentary constituency
Knowsley North and Sefton East (UK Parliament constituency), former parliamentary constituency (1997–2010)
Knowsley North (UK Parliament constituency), former parliamentary constituency (1983–1997)
Knowsley South (UK Parliament constituency), former parliamentary constituency (1983–2010)
Knowsley Hall, stately home
Knowsley Community College, further education college
Knowsley Road, former home stadium of St Helens RFC (rugby league)

Australia
Knowsley, Victoria, hamlet